Cuore di mamma (also known as Mother's Heart) is a 1969 Italian comedy drama film directed by Salvatore Samperi.

Cast
 Philippe Leroy: Andrea Franti
 Beba Loncar: Magda Franti
 Carla Gravina: Lorenza Garroni
 Yorgo Voyagis: Carlo
 Paolo Graziosi: Mariano
 Rina Franchetti: Berta
 Nicoletta Rizzi: Eleonora

Production
The character played by Carla Gravina has three children played by Mauro Gravina, Monica Gravina and Massimiliano Ferendeles. In real life Mauro and Monica are siblings, but they aren't Carla Gravina's relatives.

References

External links
 

1969 films
Films directed by Salvatore Samperi
Italian comedy-drama films
Films scored by Ennio Morricone
1969 comedy-drama films
1960s Italian films